Juwono Sudarsono (born Banjar Ciamis, West Java; 5 March 1942) is an Indonesian former diplomat and the author of works on political science and international relations. He was educated at the University of Indonesia, Jakarta (B.A., M.S.); The Institute of Social Studies, The Hague, the Netherlands; the University of California, Berkeley, USA (M.A.) ; and the London School of Economics, UK (Ph.D.). He is currently an Emeritus Professor of the University of Indonesia.

He is the son of Dr. Sudarsono, who was Minister of Home Affairs and Minister for Social Affairs in the late 1940s in the Second Sjahrir Cabinet. He served as head of the department of International Relations and Dean of the Faculty of Social and Political Sciences, University of Indonesia (1985-1994) and taught at The School of Public and International Affairs, Columbia University, New York City in 1986-87.

In public service, Juwono Sudarsono has served as Vice Governor of The National Defence College (Lemhannas), 1995-1998; Minister of State for the Environment under President Suharto, 1998; Minister of Education and Culture under President B.J. Habibie, 1998-1999; Minister of Defence under President Abdurrahman Wahid (the first civilian to occupy this position in 50 years), 1999-2000; Ambassador to the United Kingdom under President Megawati Sukarnoputri, 2003-2004; and Minister for Defence under President Susilo Bambang Yudhoyono, 2004-2009.

External links

Juwono Sudarsono
Profile at TokohIndonesia.com (In Indonesian)

1942 births
Living people
Alumni of the London School of Economics
Ambassadors of Indonesia to the United Kingdom
Columbia University faculty
Defense ministers of Indonesia
Environment ministers of Indonesia
Indo people
Indonesian Muslims
Indonesian people of Dutch descent
People from Ciamis
University of California, Berkeley alumni
University of Indonesia alumni
Academic staff of the University of Indonesia